The South Australian Railways A Class locomotives arrived for the South Australian Railways in September and October 1868 from Robert Stephenson and Company. A third and final locomotive was ordered and arrived in 1873, these locomotives were withdrawn between 1893 and 1924 from the SAR after many years of hard service.

History
The railway line from Roseworthy to Forresters (now known as Tarlee), was opened of rail traffic on the 5th of July 1896. The line was originally designed and intended for horse traction and was laid with light 40 pound rail. The idea of horsepower was later discarded and eventually the first two locomotives imported from the Robert Stephenson and Company arrived. These first lot of two locomotives were designated the "A Class" and were put to work on the Roseworthy to Forresters line. The A class were a first for the South Australian Railways, being the first Broad Gauge locomotives to be fitted with outside cylinders. Though not long after these new locomotives arrived they were found to be quite rigid in their wheelbase and too heavy for the light track. With the arrival of the new F class locomotives in September 1869 the A class had their place taken on this stretch of line. 

Following the A class locomotives being moved from the Roseworthy to Forresters railway line, they were then placed in service on the Port line. On the Port line these locomotives proved to be a much more valuable asset, so much so that a third locomotive was ordered from Robert Stephenson and Company and arrived in 1873. Over their career these three engines were allocated to suburban passenger and goods services around the South Australian Railways network. Together these locomotives performed shunting duties for many years at various locations, including the Adelaide railway yard. One of the three locomotives was stationed for a period of years at Strathalbyn and was in service to work from Strathalbyn to Milang. The Milang line was a branch off the Victor Harbor Railway Line.

References

A
Broad gauge locomotives in Australia
Robert Stephenson and Company locomotives

Scrapped locomotives 
2-4-0WT locomotives